The 2007–08 Welsh Alliance League, known as the design2print Welsh Alliance League for sponsorship reasons, is the 24th season of the Welsh Alliance League, which is in the third level of the Welsh football pyramid.

The league consists of fifteen teams and concluded with Bethesda Athletic as champions.

Teams
Denbigh Town were champions in the previous season. Gwynedd League's second place team Amlwch Town and third place team Nantlle Vale were promoted to the Welsh Alliance League

Grounds and locations

League table

References

Welsh Alliance League seasons
2007–08 in Welsh football leagues